Asia Jaya LRT station is an elevated rapid transit station in Petaling Jaya, Selangor, Malaysia, forming part of the Kelana Jaya Line. The station was opened on September 1, 1998, as part of the line's first segment encompassing 10 elevated stations between Kelana Jaya station and Pasar Seni station (not including the KL Sentral station opened later), and the line's maintenance depot in Lembah Subang.

Location
Asia Jaya station is located on the southern edge of Petaling Jaya's Section 14, a residential area, off the main thoroughfare of Jalan Utara (North Road) to the east and Jalan 51A/223 (51A/223 Road) to the south, positioning itself between several civic, industrial, commercial and residential districts. Among them, Sections 8 (residential area), 51A (industrial area) and 52 ("New" Petaling Jaya town and public and commercial buildings) to the south and east, and Section 14 to the north. Tenaga Nasional's Petaling Jaya branch is located directly south of the station.

Asia Jaya station is currently named after the former Asia Jaya shopping complex, which was converted into the Armada Hotel later during the 1990s, on the opposite side of Jalan Utara.

Bus services
In comparison to Taman Jaya station, Asia Jaya station is linked to three bus stops that significantly increase the station's reach around Petaling Jaya and neighbouring towns and cities more than Taman Jaya station. Asia Jaya station's own bus stop primarily links Sections 12, 13, 14, 16, 17 and 19 of Petaling Jaya to the station. Within a walking distance, two more bus stops at both sides of the Federal Highway allow users to board buses that shuttle between Kuala Lumpur, Klang, Shah Alam, Subang Jaya and the rest of Petaling Jaya.

Aeroline, an executive bus service to Singapore, used to operate from the front entrance of Menara Axis (Axis Tower) opposite the Asia Jaya station before shifting operations to the Bandar Utama bus hub, located outside 1 Utama, in December 2006.

See also

 Rail transport in Malaysia

References

Kelana Jaya Line
Railway stations opened in 1998
1998 establishments in Malaysia